The Ammanford transmitting station is a broadcasting and telecommunications facility located on Mynydd y Betws about  to the south east of the town of Ammanford, in Carmarthenshire, Wales. The building was originally built by Messrs. T. Richard Jones of Ammanford for the BBC, entering service in 1968 acting as a relay transmitter for the now-defunct 405-line VHF television system.

The television broadcast primarily covered the towns of Ammanford, Brynamman, Cwmamman and indeed much of the valley of the Amman river.

405-line television from this site was shut down in 1983. From this point onwards, the site has handled telecommunications services only (including service as a mobile phone mast).

Services listed by frequency

Analogue television

21 October 1968 - Second Quarter 1983

See also
List of masts
List of radio stations in the United Kingdom
List of tallest buildings and structures in Great Britain

References

External links
 MB21's page on BBC 405 TV to Wales and the West
 405 Alive's list of transmitters"
 More details on 405-line BBC transmitters

Buildings and structures in Carmarthenshire
Haverfordwest VHF 405-line Transmitter Group